The Bionics Institute is a medical research institute focusing on medical device development. It is located in Melbourne, Australia.

History
The Bionics Institute was founded in 1986 by Professor Graeme Clark AC, one of the original developers of the cochlear implant. From 2005 to 2017, the Bionics Institute was under the directorship of Professor Rob Shepherd AM. He drove the expansion of research into different areas of clinical need including neurological conditions, blindness and inflammatory bowel disease. In 2017, Robert Klupacs was appointed as CEO and he has driven a major expansion of the institute into a broader range of auto-immune, chronic, brain, hearing and vision research while also ensuring commercialistaion of research through the creation of several spin-off companies.

Location
The Bionics Institute has two campuses, one located in East Melbourne and the other in nearby Fitzroy. Mollison House (East Melbourne) is the site of the institute's administrative team as well as the bulk of its human research. The second campus exists in the Daly Wing of St Vincent's Hospital, Melbourne which houses the institute's wet labs and device fabrication facilities.

Research
The Bionics Institute's research is in three areas: auto-immunune and chronic conditions; brain conditions; hearing impairment and vision loss.

Auto-immune and chronic conditions
The use of electricity to alter the activity of nerves has given rise to a range of new treatments for auto-immune and chronic conditions that are poorly controlled by drugs, including" Chrohn's disease, rheumatoid arthritis, type 2 diabetes and incontinence.

Brain conditions
A range of devices are under development to improve outcomes for people with conditions affecting the brain, including: Alzheimer's disease, Parkinson's disease and stroke.

Hearing impairment and vision loss
Hearing impairment research at the Bionics Institute focuses on restoring hearing for those that suffer from hearing loss; developing a medical device designed to optimise language development in hearing impaired babies; exploring the use of light to improve the selectivity of auditory nerve stimulation provided by cochlear implants and other neural stimulation devices; developing an objective test for tinnitus; improving programming of cochlear implants: and understanding the hearing brain and understanding listening effort.

Funding
The Bionics Institute is funded through a combination of government funding, private donations, and contract research. In 2019, the institute's annual expenditure was A$10.8 million. In 2019, 26.5% income was from Government Grants and 18.6% income was from donations and bequests.

Commercialistion
Bionics Institute founder, Professor Graeme Clark led the team that created Australia's cochlear implant that was commercialised by Cochlear Pty Ltd. Since then, Bionics Institute research has led to the creation of three spin-off companies: Epi-Minder to commercialise an epilepsy seizure monitoring device; DBS Tech to commercialise adaptive deep brain stimulation system for Parkinson's disease; and Neo-Bionica a specialised medical device design and manufacturing company.

Collaborations

The University of Melbourne, Medical Bionics Department
From July 2012, the University of Melbourne School of Medicine and Dentistry created Medical Bionics Department in partnership with the Bionics Institute. In 2013 the Medical Bionics Department offered its first postgraduate PhD program. A/Prof James Fallon is the head of the Medical Bionics Department of the University of Melbourne.

See also

Health in Australia

References

Bionics Institute
Research institutes established in 1984
1984 establishments in Australia
University of Melbourne
University of New South Wales
La Trobe University
University of Wollongong